1000minds is a web application for decision-making and conjoint analysis supplied by 1000minds Ltd since 2002.

1000minds implements the PAPRIKA method to help business, government and non-profit users to make decisions based on considering multiple objectives or criteria (i.e., multi-criteria decision making). 1000minds conjoint analysis involves surveying people about their preferences with respect to the relative importance of features or attributes characterizing products or other objects of interest.

In addition, a free consumer-oriented web application based on 1000minds technology to help with ‘everyday’ decision-making, known as MeenyMo, was released in 2016.

Overview
1000minds helps with decisions that involve ranking, prioritizing or choosing between alternatives when multiple objectives or criteria need to be considered simultaneously (i.e., multi-criteria decision making). Depending on the application, budgets or other scarce resources can also be allocated across competing alternatives in pursuit of maximum 'value for money'.

The PAPRIKA method is used to determine the relative importance of criteria or attributes and rank alternatives. Invented by Franz Ombler and Paul Hansen at the University of Otago, the PAPRIKA method is based on pairwise comparisons, as illustrated in the accompanying image.

1000minds is also for group decision-making, involving potentially hundreds or thousands of participants – working together or individually with their results aggregated.

1000minds conjoint analysis surveys are for discovering consumers’ or other stakeholders’ preferences with respect to the relative importance – represented by ‘part-worth utilities’ or ‘weights’ – of the features or attributes characterizing products or other objects of interest (i.e., choice modelling, conjoint analysis and discrete choice).

Applications
As well as business, government and non-profit organizations, as evidenced by the citations below, 1000minds is used for research at over 180 universities worldwide, including for teaching. 1000minds (originally branded as Point Wizard) and several of its applications have won or been a finalist for a number of innovation awards.

Areas in which 1000minds is used include the following notable examples.

Health 
Prioritising patients for elective (non-urgent) surgery, rheumatology and nephrology, geriatrics and gastroenterology
Identifying criteria for diagnosing and classifying rheumatoid arthritis, systemic sclerosis, gout, autoinflammatory disease, cryopyrin-associated periodic syndrome, dermatomyositis and polymyositis, pediatric post-thrombotic syndrome, systemic lupus erythematosus, Sjögren's syndrome and glucocorticoid toxicity
Measuring patient responses in clinical trials for chronic gout
Testing physical function for patients following hip or knee replacement and educating people with osteoarthritis
Developing clinical guidelines for treatment
Health technology prioritization
Prioritizing antibiotic-resistant diseases for R&D

Environment
Environmental resources management for the ocean
Restoration of endangered plant species
Ecology research ethics
Sustainable agriculture

Urban planning and waste management 
Urban planning
Waste management

Breeding 
Animal breeding
Plant breeding

Policy-making research 
Monetary policy research
Retirement income policies research

Management and accounting 
Corporate strategic management
Measuring business goodwill

Information and communication technology (ICT)
Cloud computing
Intelligent transportation systems

Miscellaneous
Marketing research for mobile banking and fruit juice
Energy-efficiency decision-making
Tourism development
Evaluating decision-making software
Research into charitable-giving
Flipped classroom design

References

Decision-making software
Science software